Transmural pressure is the difference in pressure between two sides of a wall or equivalent separator.

For body vasculature or other hollow organs, see Smooth muscle#Contraction and relaxation basics
For lungs, see Transpulmonary pressure
Vascular smooth muscles contract in response to increased transmural pressure and relax in response to decreased transmural pressure